The sulfate carbonates are a compound carbonates, or mixed anion compounds that contain sulfate and carbonate ions. Sulfate carbonate minerals are in the 7.DG and 5.BF Nickel-Strunz groupings.

They may be formed by crystallization from a water solution, or by melting a carbonate and sulfate together.

In some structures carbonate and sulfate can substitute for each other. For example a range from 1.4 to 2.2 Na2SO4•Na2CO3 is stable as a solid solution. Silvialite can substitute about half its sulfate with carbonate and the high temperature hexagonal form of sodium sulfate (I) Na2SO4 can substitute unlimited proportions of carbonate instead of sulfate.

Minerals

Artificial

References

Sulfates
Sulfate minerals
Carbonate minerals
Carbonates
Mixed anion compounds